Abbey Foregate railway station was in Shrewsbury, Shropshire, south-east of Shrewsbury station, to the east of Severn Bridge Junction, on what is today the Shrewsbury to Wolverhampton Line. Despite its name, the nearest road was Underdale Road, not Abbey Foregate.

History
Opened by the Shrewsbury and Birmingham Railway in 1849, the station name was changed to Abbey Foregate Platform around 1900. It closed to passengers in 1912.

Today there remains a signal box on the line to Wolverhampton called Abbey Foregate (code of 'AF'). It controls the junction and the access to Abbey Foregate Yard. No remains of the platform exist.

See also
Shrewsbury Abbey railway station - a station on Abbey Foregate

References

Further reading

Former Shrewsbury and Wellington Joint Railway stations
Disused railway stations in Shropshire
Buildings and structures in Shrewsbury
Railway stations in Great Britain opened in 1849
Railway stations in Great Britain closed in 1912